Kentro may refer to several places in Greece:

Kentro, Grevena, a village in the municipal unit Ventzio, Grevena regional unit
Kentro, Elis, a village in the municipal unit Amaliada, Elis  
Kentro, Messenia, a village in the municipal unit Avia, Messenia

See also: Kentron (disambiguation)